The Melvin River is an  river in the Lakes Region of central New Hampshire in the United States. It is a tributary of Lake Winnipesaukee, part of the Merrimack River watershed.

The Melvin River lies entirely within the town of Tuftonboro. It begins at the outlet of Melvin Pond, near the town's eastern border, and flows west along the base of the Ossipee Mountains to the north. The river reaches Lake Winnipesaukee at Melvin Village.

See also

List of rivers of New Hampshire

References

Tributaries of the Merrimack River
Rivers of New Hampshire
Rivers of Carroll County, New Hampshire